The following is a list of county roads in Sherburne County, Minnesota, United States. Some of the routes included in this list are also county state-aid highways (CSAH).

Route list

References 

Sherburne
Transportation in Sherburne County, Minnesota